Hypatia Bradlaugh Bonner (31 March 1858 – 25 August 1935) was a British peace activist, author, atheist and freethinker, and the daughter of Charles Bradlaugh.

Early life and teaching
She was born Hypatia Bradlaugh, at 3 Hedger's Terrace, Hackney, London, the second daughter of Charles Bradlaugh, the first openly atheist Member of Parliament and founder of the National Secular Society, and Susannah Lamb Hooper. She was named after Hypatia, the Ancient Greek pagan philosopher, mathematician, astronomer and teacher, who was murdered by a mob of Coptic monks under the authority of Christian archbishop Cyril of Alexandria.

Bradlaugh Bonner was educated in private schools in London and Paris, and qualified as a science teacher from the University of London, which admitted women to "full privileges" (i.e. degrees) in 1878. She taught in the Hall of Science for the South Kensington Science and Art Examinations, and also acted as a secretary for her father after 1888.

The Halls of Science were mainly for adult education and self-help, like those offered by Mechanics' Institutes and religious organisations at the time. The South Kensington Hall of Science was started by Edward Aveling, and other teachers included her sister Alice Bradlaugh (1856–1888) and Annie Besant. The results from the South Kensington Hall of Science were very good, with students exceeding the national average on their examinations in all but one of their offered classes.

Bonner was also a lecturer for the National Secular Society and the Rationalist Press Association.

Writing
Bonner is most remembered for being the author of her father's biography, Charles Bradlaugh: His Life and Work.  The Spectator considered the two volumes to be more memoirs than a biography: "That it is preposterously long is manifest at once. More than eight hundred closely printed pages are too much for Charles Bradlaugh, viewed in regard to his real importance in the world", but accepted, "A day will come when they will be found useful".

From 1897 to 1904, she was editor of The Reformer, the main purpose of which according to Bernard Porter was to "vindicate her father's career".

However, she was an active contributor to many secularist periodicals including the National Reformer and author of many other books relating to secularism, blasphemy and freethinking. She often wrote in collaboration with her sister Alice under the signature 'A. and H. Bradlaugh', including a regular current affairs column in the National Reformer called 'Summary of News' during the 1880s. In Penalties upon Opinion she catalogues various trials and cases of blasphemy including the recent revival in blasphemy prosecutions in the first decades of the 20th century. In addition, she published a volume of short stories for children (Princess Vera, and Other Stories, 1886) as part of the Freethought Publishing Company's Young Folks' Library series.

Peace activism
In the lead up to the First World War most peace societies were Christian associations. In 1910, Bonner became the chairperson of the first secular peace society, the Rationalist Peace Society. The aim of the society was to "protest against ideas and methods which are utterly opposed to reason and the interests of social progress". In her introduction to Essays towards peace, Hypatia noted that there was a "growing public opinion in favour of arbitration as the alternative to war" and that it was reason that demonstrated "the futility, the brutality, the economic waste, the immorality of war".

The Rationalist Peace Society remained active throughout the war, but fell into decline after peace was concluded.

Personal life

She married Arthur Bonner in 1885 in Marylebone, London. They had two children, Kenneth (June – September 1886) and Charles Bradlaugh Bonner (28 April 1890 – 2 September 1966).

She died at home on 25 August 1935 at 23 Streathbourne Road, Tooting, London, after an abdominal operation for cancer. She was cremated at Golders Green Crematorium on 28 August, and her ashes were buried in her father's grave at Brookwood Cemetery.

Publications
 Charles Bradlaugh: A Record of His Life and Work (Volume 1, Volume 2, 1894)
 The Gallows and the Lash (1897)
 Penalties Upon Opinion (1912)
 The Christian Hell (1913) 
 Christianity and Conduct (1919)

References
 Notes

 References
 Edward Royle, The Infidel Tradition from Paine to Bradlaugh, MacMillan Press Ltd, London, 1976.  . 
 Edward Royle, Radicals, Secularists and Republicans: Popular Freethought in Britain, 1866–1915, Manchester University Press, Manchester, 1980. .

External links

 
 

1858 births
1935 deaths
19th-century atheists
19th-century English non-fiction writers
19th-century English women writers
19th-century English writers
Burials at Brookwood Cemetery
Critics of Christianity
English atheists
English biographers
English pacifists
English women non-fiction writers
Freethought writers
Non-interventionism
People associated with Conway Hall Ethical Society
People from Hackney Central
Writers from London